MitoQ–NZ Cycling Project is a New Zealand UCI Continental cycling team focusing on road bicycle racing. The team is run by ex-professional Roman Van Uden with James Canny, ex elite rider, the founder.

Team roster

Major wins
Source:
2023
 Gravel and Tar Classic, Ben Oliver

References

Cycling teams based in New Zealand
Cycling teams established in 2022
2022 establishments in New Zealand
UCI Continental Teams (Oceania)